National Secondary Route 201, or just Route 201 (or ) is a National Road Route of Costa Rica, located in the San José province.

Description
In San José province the route covers Goicoechea canton (Guadalupe, Calle Blancos districts), Montes de Oca canton (Mercedes district).

References

Highways in Costa Rica